Peter C. Swanson (born March 26, 1974) is a former American football Offensive Guard who played one season for the St. Louis Rams. He also played for the Rhein Fire.

Early life
Pete Swanson was born on March 26, 1974 in Hollister, California

Professional career
Swanson was originally signed with the Kansas City Chiefs in 1997 as an undrafted free agent. But he did not play any games. In 1999 he was picked in the Cleveland Browns Expansion Draft. He also signed with the San Francisco 49ers in 1999 but did not play any games. He played with the Rhein Fire and St Louis Rams in 2000, he played 3 games with the Rams. In his NFL career he played 3 games.

References

Los Angeles Rams players
1974 births
Players of American football from California
Living people
Rhein Fire players
Stanford Cardinal football players
American football offensive linemen
People from Hollister, California